The Ammunition Hunters is a 1971 Taiwanese action film directed by Ting Shan-hsi, starring Peter Yang and Chen Chen.

Cast
Peter Yang
Chen Chen
Sally Chen
Sun Yueh
Sit Hon
Shan Mao
Ko Hsiang-ting
O Yau Man
So Gam Lung
Tsui Fu-sheng
Yeung Fui Yuk

External links

The Ammunition Hunters at HKcinemamagic.com

1971 action films
1971 films
1971 martial arts films
Kung fu films
Taiwanese martial arts films
Films set in the 1920s
Films set in China
Films directed by Ting Shan-hsi